Auntie's Portrait is a 1915 short comedy film.

External links 
 

Silent American comedy films
American silent short films
American black-and-white films
1915 films
Films directed by George D. Baker
1915 comedy films
1915 short films
American comedy short films
1910s American films
1910s English-language films